Guy-Marie Riobé (1911–1978) was a French Catholic Bishop of Orléans in office 1963 to 1978. He held liberal, progressive views influenced by the climate of the Second Vatican Council. 

He became prominent because of an altercation with Admiral Sanguinetti, over France's possession of a nuclear deterrent. He died following a swimming accident. His successor, Jean-Marie Lustiger, avoided any reference to Riobé during his installation after a fifteen-month interregnum (1979).

Riobé promoted a de-centered vision of the priesthood, arguing in favor of the creation of new types of ministries.

References

1911 births
1978 deaths
Participants in the Second Vatican Council
20th-century Roman Catholic bishops in France
Bishops of Orléans